Mercédesz Szigetvári (born 14 May 1998) is a Hungarian judoka.

She is the silver medallist of the 2021 Judo Grand Prix Zagreb in the +78 kg category.

References

External links
 

1998 births
Living people
Hungarian female judoka
European Games competitors for Hungary
Judoka at the 2019 European Games
21st-century Hungarian women